Charles Roland may refer to:

 Charles Gordon Roland (1933–2009), physician and historian
 Charles P. Roland (born 1918), American historian and professor